Forrest B. "Frosty" Cox (January 22, 1908 – May 22, 1962) was an American college basketball coach. He was the head basketball coach at the University of Colorado Boulder from 1936 to 1950 and the University of Montana from 1955 to 1962, compiling a career record of 227–174. Cox led the Colorado Buffaloes to three NCAA Tournaments and two National Invitation Tournament including the 1942 NCAA Final Four and the 1940 NIT title.  He also was an assistant football coach and the position coach for Byron "Whizzer" White, during his All-American season in 1937

Head coaching record

See also
 List of NCAA Division I Men's Final Four appearances by coach

References

1908 births
1962 deaths
All-American college men's basketball players
American men's basketball coaches
American men's basketball players
Basketball coaches from Montana
Basketball players from Montana
Colorado Buffaloes football coaches
Colorado Buffaloes men's basketball coaches
Guards (basketball)
Kansas Jayhawks football coaches
Kansas Jayhawks football players
Kansas Jayhawks men's basketball coaches
Kansas Jayhawks men's basketball players
Montana Grizzlies basketball coaches
Sportspeople from Missoula, Montana